The Cornell Big Red represented Cornell University in ECAC women's ice hockey during the 2015–16 NCAA Division I women's ice hockey season. The Big Red had the challenge of trying to find success despite the graduation of stars Brianne Jenner, Emily Fulton and Jillian Saulnier.

Offseason

Three 2015 graduates, Brianne Jenner (Calgary Inferno), Emily Fulton (Toronto Furies) and Jillian Saulnier (Calgary Inferno), were all selected in the CWHL draft.

Recruiting

2015–16 Big Red

Schedule

|-
!colspan=12 style=""| Regular Season

|-
!colspan=12 style=""| ECAC Tournament

Awards and honors

Micah Hart, D, All-ECAC Rookie Team

References

Cornell
Cornell Big Red women's ice hockey seasons
Cornell
Cornell